The 1908 Denver Pioneers football team represented the University of Denver as a member of the Colorado Football Association (CFA) during the 1908 college football season. In their third season under head coach John P. Koehler, the Pioneers compiled a 7–1 record (3–0 in conference play), won the CFA championship, and outscored opponents by a total of 153 to 37. The team's only loss was by an 8–4 score in the final game of the season against Pop Warner's Carlisle Indians.

Schedule

References

Denver
Denver Pioneers football seasons
Denver Pioneers football